Bushing may refer to:

Bushing (bearing), a type of plain bearing
Bushing (electrical), an insulated device that allows a conductor to pass through a grounded conducting barrier 
Bushing (isolator), a mechanical device used to reduce vibrational energy transfer between two parts
Drill bushing, a tool used to guide the placement of a holes when drilling in a workpiece
Threaded bushing, a metal sleeve with screw threads

See also
 Büsching (disambiguation)